Walter Scherff (1 November 1898 – 24 May 1945) was a German army officer and military historian with the rank of Generalmajor, who was appointed by Adolf Hitler to the Oberkommando der Wehrmacht in May 1942 to compile the history of the war, as the Führer's Commissioner for the Writing of Military History.

Early career

Walter Scherff was born on 1 November 1898 in Cannstatt, Württemberg as the son of construction council. At the age of 17 he passed his Kriegsabitur (war time diploma, a school leaving certificate under accelerated conditions) and was assigned as Fahnenjunker (Cadet Officer) to the replacement battalion of 127th Infantry Regiment (9. Württembergisches Infanterie-Regiment Nr. 127) in Ulm.

Scherff was transferred to the Western Front few weeks later and was promoted to Fähnrich (Officer candidate) in September 1916. He participated in the Battle of the Somme and rose to the capacity of Platoon leader. Scherff was commissioned Leutnant (Second lieutenant) in February 1917 and took part in the combats in Lorraine, Aisne and Verdun. Scherff was later wounded in action and following his recovery, he served as Battalion's Adjutant in his regiment. For his service during the War, he was decorated with both classes of the Prussian Iron Cross and also received Württemberg Military Merit Medal for bravery.

Interwar period

Following the War, Scherff was accepted into the new Army of Germany, the Reichswehr, limited by the terms of Treaty of Versailles only to 100,000 men. He served with 26th Rifle Regiment (Reichswehr-Schützen-Regiment 26) as company commander, before he was transferred to the 13th Infantry Regiment in Ludwigsburg in early 1920. Scherff was appointed Adjutant of 3rd Battalion of his regiment in Ulm in 1923 and while in this capacity, he was promoted to Oberleutnant (First lieutenant) in April 1925.

In early 1927, Scherff assumed duty as commander of 12th Company (Machine Gun) in his regiment and remained in that capacity until October that year, when he was transferred to the regimental staff under Colonel Kurt von Greiff. He later led 8th Company (Machine Gun) of his regiment until October 1929, when he was assigned to the staff of 5th Division under Generalleutnant Hans Freiherr Seutter von Lötzen in Stuttgart. While in this capacity, Scherff completed three-year general staff training.

Upon completion of the training in October 1929, Scherff assumed command of 3rd Company of 12th Cavalry Regiment in Grimma, Saxony. He served for one year in this capacity, when he was transferred to the Reichswehrministerium in Berlin. While there, Scherff was promoted to Hauptmann (Captain) in March 1933 and transferred to the Generalstab in October 1935.

In April 1936, Scherff was appointed company commander in 13th Infantry Regiment and was promoted to Major in August that year. He was subsequently transferred to the staff of 21st Infantry Division in Elbing, East Prussia in April 1937 and served as 1st General Staff officer under Generalleutnant Albert Wodrig.

Scherff was ordered back to Berlin in October 1938 and assigned to the Oberkommando des Heeres (OKH - supreme command of the Army) for service with the 7th Department of the Oberquartiermeister (Higher logistics general). He was promoted to Oberstleutnant (Lieutenant colonel) in April 1939.

World War II

Following the outbreak of World War II, Scherff assumed duty as Chief of the 7th Department in OKH and was promoted to Oberst (Colonel) in September 1941. He was transferred to the Oberkommando der Wehrmacht in May 1942 and appointed by Adolf Hitler to compile the history of the war, as the Führer's Commissioner for the Writing of Military History. During his first visit in the office of General Friedrich von Rabenau, the Chief of Army Archive in May 1942, Scherff had an argument with him over the concept of work of Army Archive. As ardent Nazi, Scherff opposed Rabenau's vision to conduct objective research work, pointed that only relevant thing for Archive's work are Hitler's directives and orders.

One month later, Scherff succeeded General Rabenau as Chief of Army Archiv and Rabenau, who was known as a harsh critic of Nazism, was relieved of duties as politically unreliable. Rabenau was later involved in the 20 July Plot and executed in 1945.

As a new Chief for military history, Scherff was tasked with the unified presentation of fight for Greater German Reich and was responsible for determinating, which military literature is suitable to be published and used. For his new assignment, Scherff was promoted to Generalmajor in September 1943 and later received both classes of War Merit Cross with swords for his merits.

He was also present at the Wolf's Lair headquarters in Rastenburg, East Prussia during the 20 July plot and was seriously injured by the bomb. Scherff was burned in the face and both hands and Adolf Hitler later visited him in the hospital. For his wounds, Scherff was decorated personally by Hitler with the Wound Badge of 20 July 1944 as one of the twenty four recipients of this award.

Scherff was responsible for the destruction of parts of the complete stenographic record of Hitler's military conferences despite not having the authority to do so. Those copies under the administration of the Stenographic Service were ordered burned early in May 1945, at his direction. His personal copies were also "probably" burned, according to historians, as "Scherff made it plain that his opinion of Hitler as a general had changed, and he strongly criticized the military strategy of the last few years."

A great admirer of Hitler, he committed suicide by means of a cyanide capsule while in American captivity. Scherff was married to Ella Haas.

Decorations
 Wound Badge of 20 July 1944
War Merit Cross (1939) with Swords
 2nd Class 
 1st Class
 Prussian Iron Cross (1914)
 2nd Class (World War I)
 1st Class (World War I)
 Württemberg Military Merit Medal (World War I)
 Wound Badge in Black (World War I)
 Wound Badge of 20 July 1944
 Wehrmacht Long Service Award, 1st Class
 Honour Cross of the World War 1914/1918

References

Printed 

 

1898 births
1945 suicides
Major generals of the German Army (Wehrmacht)
Nazis who committed suicide in Germany
Recipients of the Iron Cross, 1st class
Suicides by cyanide poisoning
German prisoners of war in World War II held by the United States
Nazis who committed suicide in prison custody
German military personnel who committed suicide
Prisoners who died in United States military detention
Military personnel from Stuttgart